Walter Raymond Stokes (May 23, 1898 – June 9, 1996) was an American sport shooter who competed in the 1924 Summer Olympics.

Life
He was born on May 23, 1898, in Mohawk, Florida.

In 1924, he won the gold medal as member of the American team in the team free rifle event, and the bronze medal in the team running deer, single shots, competition. At the 1924 Summer Olympics, he also participated in the following events:

 600 metre free rifle - fourth place
 Team running deer, double shots - fifth place
 running deer, single shots - tenth place
 50 metre rifle, prone - tenth place
 running deer, double shots - twelfth place

He died on June 9, 1996, in Stuart, Florida.

References

External links
profile

1898 births
1996 deaths
American male sport shooters
ISSF rifle shooters
Running target shooters
Shooters at the 1924 Summer Olympics
Olympic gold medalists for the United States in shooting
Olympic bronze medalists for the United States in shooting
Medalists at the 1924 Summer Olympics